Yassine El Mahsini (born 26 October 1993) is a Belgian-Moroccan basketball player who currently plays for AS Salé of the Division Excellence.

Professional career
El Mahsini joined the senior selection of BC Oostende in 2012, after playing in the junior ranks of the club before. Over two seasons, he appeared in 9 games in the Pro Basketball League.

Since 2016, El Mahsini is a member of AS Salé.

BAL career statistics

|-
| style="text-align:left;"|2021
| style="text-align:left;"|AS Salé
| 4 || 4 || 34.1 || .304 || .444 || .400 || 5.5 || 5.0 || 1.8 || .5 || 5.0
|-
|- class="sortbottom"
| style="text-align:center;" colspan="2"|Career
| 4 || 4 || 34.1 || .304 || .444 || .400 || 5.5 || 5.0 || 1.8 || .5 || 5.0

References

External links

1993 births
Living people
AS Salé (basketball) players
Point guards
BC Oostende players
Belgian men's basketball players
Moroccan men's basketball players